Route 56 may refer to:

Route 56 (MTA Maryland), in Baltimore, Maryland, U.S.
London Buses route 56, in England
SEPTA Route 56, in Philadelphia, U.S.

See also
 List of highways numbered 56

56